Crataegus spathulata is a species hawthorn known by the common name littlehip hawthorn. It is native to the southeastern United States. It has very attractive small delicate leaves with a bluish appearance, pretty flowers and small orange to red fruit.

References

External links
 

spathulata
Flora of North America